Backyard Wrestling 2: There Goes the Neighborhood is a fighting video game developed by Paradox Development, and published by Eidos Interactive in 2004 for PlayStation 2 and Xbox. It is the second installment in the  Backyard Wrestling series and the sequel to Backyard Wrestling: Don't Try This at Home. The licensed soundtrack includes music by Andrew W.K., Kool Keith, the Insane Clown Posse, Bad Brains, Body Count, Six and Violence, Mudvayne, Saliva, Fall Out Boy, and Hoobastank.

Gameplay

The roster of underground wrestlers features more than 20 combatants, including notable hardcore wrestlers, music personalities, and adult film actresses.

The game was billed as being greatly improved over its predecessor, including a more in depth create-a-wrestler mode. The game includes an option for turning the game's blood effects on and off; the original game does not have said option. Each wrestler now has an introduction video. There are also four unlockable music videos.

Roster

Reception

Backyard Wrestling 2: There Goes the Neighborhood received "generally unfavorable" reviews on both platforms according to video game review aggregator Metacritic. In Japan, Famitsu gave the PlayStation 2 version a score of one six, two sevens, and one six, for a total of 26 out of 40.

References

External links

2004 video games
Eidos Interactive games
PlayStation 2 games
Square Enix franchises
Video game sequels
Video games developed in the United States
Xbox games
Multiplayer and single-player video games
Professional wrestling games
Video games using Havok